Keturah (Qəṭūrā, possibly meaning "incense") was a wife and a concubine of the Biblical patriarch Abraham. According to the Book of Genesis, Abraham married Keturah after the death of his first wife, Sarah. Abraham and Keturah had six sons.

According to Jewish tradition, she was a descendant of Noah's son Japheth.

One modern commentator on the Hebrew Bible has called Keturah "the most ignored significant person in the Torah". The medieval Jewish commentator Rashi, and some previous rabbinical commentators, related a traditional belief that Keturah was the same person as Hagar, although this idea cannot be found in the biblical text.

According to Doctor of Anthropology Paula M. McNutt, it is generally recognized that there is nothing specific in the biblical traditions recorded in Genesis, including those regarding Abraham and his family, that can be definitively related to known history in or around Canaan in the early second millennium B.C.E.

Sources for Keturah 
Keturah is mentioned in two passages of the Hebrew Bible: in the Book of Genesis, and also in the First Book of Chronicles. Additionally, she is mentioned in Antiquities of the Jews by the 1st-century Romano-Jewish historian Josephus, in the Talmud, the Midrash, the Targum on the Torah, the Genesis Rabbah, and various other writings of Jewish theologians and philosophers.

Louis Feldman has said "Josephus records evidence of the prolific non-Jewish polymath Alexander Polyhistor, who, in turn, cites the historian Cleodemus Malchus, who states that two of the sons of Abraham by Keturah joined Heracles' campaign in Africa, and that Heracles, without doubt the greatest Greek hero of them all, married the daughter of one of them."

Relationship of Keturah to Abraham 
Keturah is referred to in Genesis as "another wife" of Abraham.  In First Chronicles, she is called Abraham's "concubine".

According to one opinion in the midrashic work Genesis Rabbah, Keturah and Hagar are names for the same person, whom Abraham remarried after initially expelling. This opinion was adopted and popularized by 11th-century scholar Rashi.

However, this idea was rejected by another rabbi in Genesis Rabbah, as well as by traditional commentators such as Ibn Ezra, Nahmanides, and Rashbam. The Book of Jubilees also supports the conclusion that Keturah and Hagar were two different people, by stating that Abraham waited until after Hagar's death before marrying Keturah. According to modern scholar Richard Elliott Friedman, the identification of Keturah with Hagar has "no basis ... in the text".

Genesis Rabbah interpreted the name Keturah in accordance with the opinion that she was identical to Hagar: the name was said to be related to the Aramaic ketur (knot) to imply that she was "bound" and did not have sexual relations with anyone else from the time she left Abraham until her return. The name Keturah was alternatively said to be derived from the ketoret (meaning "incense" in Hebrew) due to her deeds being as pleasing as incense.

Descendants 
Keturah bore Abraham six sons: Zimran, Jokshan, Medan, Midian, Ishbak, and Shuah. Genesis and First Chronicles also list seven of her grandsons (Sheba, Dedan, Ephah, Epher, Hanoch, Abida, and Eldaah).  The Book of Genesis records that Abraham gave them gifts and sent them to the East, while making Isaac son of Sarah his primary heir.  Keturah's sons were said to have represented the Arab tribes who lived south and east of Israel. According to the Judean authors Josephus and Cleodemus Malchus, Punic people were descended from Epher, grandson of Abraham and Keturah.  

According to the African writer Olaudah Equiano, the 18th-century English theologian John Gill believed the African people were descended from Abraham and Keturah.

According to the Baháʼí author John Able, Baháʼís consider their founder, Bahá'u'lláh, to have been "descended doubly, from both Abraham and Sarah, and separately from Abraham and Keturah."

References 

Midian
Family of Abraham
Jewish concubines
Women in the Hebrew Bible
Concubines
Hagar
Book of Jubilees